George Robert Reed, CM, SOM (born October 2, 1939), is a former American college football and Canadian Football League player.  Reed, along with Mike Pringle and Johnny Bright, is one of the players most often mentioned as being the greatest running back in CFL history. In November 2006, Reed was voted one of the CFL's Top 50 players (#2) of the league's modern era by Canadian sports network TSN.

Reed played his entire 13-year professional football career for the CFL Saskatchewan Roughriders and his #34 jersey is one of eight that has been retired by the club.

His daughter Georgette represented Canada in the 1992 Summer Olympics in the shot put competition.

College career 
Reed played Pacific-8 Conference college football with the Washington State University Cougars from 1959 to 1962 where he was teamed with fellow Canadian Football Hall of Famer Hugh Campbell.

CFL 
Following college, Reed signed with the Saskatchewan Roughriders where he started for 13 years from 1963 until 1975, 203 games in all. By the time he retired, Reed held career records in rushing yards (16,116), rushing touchdowns (134), and touchdowns (137).  Reed's rushing yards total has since been surpassed by National Football League stars Emmitt Smith and Walter Payton, and, in 2004 by CFL star Mike Pringle. Pringle tied Reed's total of 137 career touchdowns, and George Reed still holds the CFL rushing for touchdowns record with 134.

George Reed was voted the CFL's Most Outstanding Player for 1965 and in 1976 he was the inaugural winner of the Tom Pate Memorial Trophy for playing ability and community service. He was the MVP of the 54th Grey Cup of 1966, as Saskatchewan defeated Ottawa, his sole Grey Cup win.

On October 9, 1973, in Regina, Saskatchewan, George Reed was honored with the unique proclamation of October 9 as George Reed Day.

In 1972, while still an active player, Reed became the fourth president of the Canadian Football League Players' Association (CFLPA). He maintained the CFLPA presidency until 1981, six years after his retirement from the CFL. Reed returned as the sixth president of the CFLPA from 1986 to 1993.

Career regular season rushing statistics

Post-football career 
A naturalized Canadian citizen who is currently the Director of Guest and Community Relations at SaskGaming, Reed was made a Member of the Order of Canada in 1978, Canada's highest civilian honour, and in 1979 was inducted into the Canadian Football Hall of Fame.

He is the father of Georgette Reed who represented Canada in the women's shot put at the 1992 Summer Olympics.

In 2012 in honour of the 100th Grey Cup, Canada Post used his image on a series of commemorative postage stamps. The image was also used on presentation posters and other materials to promote the Grey Cup game and other celebrations associated with the centennial.

In November 2019, a stretch of road along the north end of the Roughriders' current home, Mosaic Stadium, was renamed "George Reed Way" in his honour, with the stadium's official address changed to 1734 George Reed Way.

In November 9, 2022, Globe Theatre located in Regina produced a live theatre show based on George Reed's CFL life(1963 to 1975) in Regina. The play is written by Munish Sharma.

References

External links
  George Robert Reed at The Canadian Encyclopedia

1939 births
Living people
African-American players of Canadian football
American emigrants to Canada
American football running backs
American players of Canadian football
Canadian Football Hall of Fame inductees
Canadian Football League Most Outstanding Player Award winners
Canadian football running backs
Members of the Order of Canada
Players of American football from Mississippi
Sportspeople from Vicksburg, Mississippi
Saskatchewan Roughriders players
Washington State Cougars football players
21st-century African-American people
20th-century African-American sportspeople